Viceconte is an Italian surname. Notable people with the surname include:

Ernesto Viceconte (1836–1877), Italian composer
Maura Viceconte (born 1967), Italian long-distance runner

Italian-language surnames
Surnames of Italian origin